PK-72 Peshawar-IV is a constituency for the Khyber Pakhtunkhwa Assembly of the Khyber Pakhtunkhwa province of Pakistan.

Members of Assembly

2018-2022 PK-69 Peshawar-IV

Elections 2018 
Syed Muhammad Ishtiaq of Pakistan Tehreek-e-Insaf won the seat by getting 17,652 votes.

See also 

 PK-71 Peshawar-III
 PK-73 Peshawar-V

References

External links 

 Khyber Pakhtunkhwa Assembly's official website
 Election Commission of Pakistan's official website
 Awaztoday.com Search Result
 Election Commission Pakistan Search Result

Khyber Pakhtunkhwa Assembly constituencies
Peshawar District